Choi Jun-yong (born April 4, 1994) is a South Korean basketball player for Seoul SK Knights and the South Korean national team.

Career

High school and college career
Choi attended Kyungbock High School and was classmates with Lee Jong-hyun. While at Kyungbock, he, Lee and their senior Moon Seong-gon, were dubbed the "Kyungbock Trio" by rival high school teams for their well-rounded offensive capabilities. Moon and Lee went on to Korea University while Choi was recruited by Yonsei University. 

During his senior year, Choi captained Yonsei to a clean sweep of the U-League regular season title and championship and the MBC Cup, the first time since 2005 Yonsei has won it. He was also named MVP of the MBC Cup tournament. At that time his teammates included future MVP Heo Hoon and future KBL Rookie of the Year Ahn Young-joon. He declared eligibility for the 2016 KBL draft.

Professional
Choi was considered one of the "big 3", along with Lee and Kang Sang-jae, of the 2016 KBL rookie draft and strong contenders for the first pick of the first round. He was drafted by Seoul SK Knights as the second pick.

After an uneventful rookie season, Choi began to grow into his role during the 2017-18 season and played a bigger role in Seoul SK Knights' second-place finish in the regular season and KBL Championship win. He averaged 9.5 points, 4.2 rebounds and 3.2 assists. After a 2018-19 season mostly plagued by injury, he returned to the side but found himself having to battle with veteran Kim Sun-hyung for a spot in the starting 5.

On December 8, 2020, it was reported that Choi had been suspended for three games by his team after he accidentally leaked a nude photograph of his teammate on his social media. He and his team immediately posted an apology, explaining that the teammate involved was also a close friend and had accepted the apology and that Choi would serve the suspension with immediate effect. The KBL further extended the suspension to five games and fined him 3 million won.

In the 2021–22 season, Choi won the KBL Most Valuable Player Award and won his second KBL championship.

National team
He participated at the 2017 FIBA Asia Cup.

References

External Links
Career Statistics from the Korean Basketball League website 

1994 births
Living people
South Korean men's basketball players
Sportspeople from Daegu
Guards (basketball)
Basketball players at the 2018 Asian Games
Asian Games bronze medalists for South Korea
Medalists at the 2018 Asian Games
Asian Games medalists in basketball
2019 FIBA Basketball World Cup players
Kyungbock High School alumni
Yonsei University alumni
21st-century South Korean people